Benjamin Beecroft (born 22 December 1998) is a New Zealand cricketer. He made his List A debut for New Zealand XI against Pakistan on 3 January 2018.

References

External links
 

1998 births
Living people
New Zealand cricketers
Place of birth missing (living people)